Dwight Drane (born May 6, 1962) is a retired professional American football safety for the Buffalo Bills of the National Football League.

He was selected by the Buffalo Bills in the 1984 NFL Supplemental Draft of USFL and CFL Players, and subsequently proceeded to anchor the Bills' defensive backfield from 1986-1991.

External links
Important Dates in Buffalo Bills History at Buffalo Bills official website{broken link}

1962 births
Living people
Players of American football from Miami
American football safeties
Oklahoma Sooners football players
Los Angeles Express players
Buffalo Bills players